The Emek Sholom Holocaust Memorial Cemetery was built in 1955 and is located within Forest Lawn Cemetery in Richmond, Virginia.  It was listed on the National Register of Historic Places in 1999. "Emek Sholom" translates into English as "Valley of Peace."

The Cemetery's website has their mission statement, brief history, photos, cemetery map, and hosts the annual "Never Again" Scholarship essays.

References

External links
 

Cemeteries on the National Register of Historic Places in Virginia
National Register of Historic Places in Henrico County, Virginia
Protected areas of Henrico County, Virginia
1955 establishments in Virginia
Cemeteries in Richmond, Virginia
Jews and Judaism in Richmond, Virginia